Oliver Buff (born 3 August 1992) is a Swiss professional footballer who plays as a midfielder.

Career

FC Zürich
Buff spent his youth years with FC Zürich and became part of the first team in 2010. He won the 2013–14 Swiss Cup and 2015–16 Swiss Cup with Zürich. After 12 years with the club he decided in May 2017 to not renew his contract.

Zaragoza
On 13 June 2017, Buff signed a two-year deal with Spanish Segunda División side Real Zaragoza.

Anorthosis Famagusta
In January 2019 Buff transferred for a reported 125,000 Euro to Anorthosis Famagusta and signed a contract up until the end of the season.

Grasshoppers
On 15 October 2019, Buff, who at that time was not under contract, signed for Grasshopper Club Zürich until the end of the season.

Selangor
After a year becoming a free agent, Buff switch sides and reach agreement to join Malaysia Super League club Selangor on 26 January 2021. He made his debut and scored two goals for the club against Sri Pahang with a 3–1 victory at the league matches.

International career
Buff is a Switzerland youth international. In 2009, he was part of the Swiss under-17 team that won the 2009 FIFA U-17 World Cup beating host nation Nigeria 1–0 in the final. Buff played in 6 of the 7 matches at the tournament and scored in the team's quarter-final against Italy.

Career statistics

Honours
Switzerland U17
FIFA U-17 World Cup: 2009

References

External links
 
 

1992 births
Living people
People from Baden, Switzerland
Association football midfielders
Swiss men's footballers
Switzerland youth international footballers
Switzerland under-21 international footballers
Footballers at the 2012 Summer Olympics
Olympic footballers of Switzerland
Swiss Super League players
Swiss Challenge League players
Segunda División players
Cypriot First Division players
Malaysia Super League players
FC Zürich players
Real Zaragoza players
Anorthosis Famagusta F.C. players
Grasshopper Club Zürich players
Swiss expatriate footballers
Swiss expatriate sportspeople in Spain
Expatriate footballers in Spain
Swiss expatriate sportspeople in Cyprus
Expatriate footballers in Cyprus
Swiss expatriates in Malaysia
Expatriate footballers in Malaysia
Sportspeople from Aargau